The Bermejo River (Spanish, Río Bermejo) is a river in South America that flows from Bolivia to the Paraguay River in Argentina. The river is generally called Bermejo in spite of its different names along its way, but it also has its own Native American names; in Wichí it is called Teuco, and in Guaraní it is called Ypitá. In the plains of Argentina's Gran Chaco the Bermejo forms wetlands and splits into two branches. The southern branch is the bed of the old Bermejo River, now an intermittent stream called Río Bermejito. The northern branch is now the main stem of the Bermejo and is called the Teuco River (Río Teuco), Bermejo Nuevo, or simply the Bermejo River.

The river is born in a mountain range known as Sierra de Santa Victoria around coordinates  near Tarija, a few kilometres southeast of Chaguaya in Bolivia, and not far from La Quiaca, Jujuy Province, Argentina. In general, it maintains a southeastern direction. At its highest part, its main tributaries are the Lipeo River, and further downstream the Grande de Tarija, the Iruya River, and the San Francisco River. It forms part of the international boundary between Argentina and Bolivia.

The Bermejo is not navigable. In the late 19th century, numerous attempts were made to open up the commercial navigation of the river, but all of them failed, largely due to the river's shallow waters, which carry enormous amounts of sediment. Near the Tropic of Capricorn, the river splits in two; the smaller southern branch, Bermejito, and the northern branch that known as the Teuco River (also called Bermejo or Bermejo Nuevo). When leaving the province of Salta, the Teuco marks the boundary between the provinces of Chaco and Formosa.

The Bermejito, is intermittent and meandering. It crosses Chaco Province near the El Impenetrable jungle. On the shores of this river can still be seen the ruins of the former towns of Concepcion del Bermejo, San Bernardo de Vértiz, and La Cangayé.

The Teuco follows its course to finality and into the Paraguay River, in front of the city of Pilar, in Paraguay.

The river carries red-coloured sediments and produces irregular accumulations that can even alter its course, leaving the older paths as wet depressions.

See also
 List of rivers of Argentina
 List of rivers of Bolivia

References

Rivers of Argentina
Rivers of Salta Province
Rivers of Chaco Province
Border rivers
Rivers of Formosa Province
International rivers of South America
Argentina–Bolivia border
Rivers of Tarija Department
Tributaries of the Paraguay River